

Herewine (or Herewin; died c. 817) was a medieval Bishop of Lichfield.

Herewine was consecrated between 814 and 816 and died between 817 and 818.

Citations

References

External links
 

810s deaths
9th-century English bishops
Anglo-Saxon bishops of Lichfield
Year of birth unknown